Caoxi Road is a station on Shanghai Metro Line 3. It is within walking distance of Shanghai's first IKEA store.

Gallery

References

Line 3, Shanghai Metro
Shanghai Metro stations in Xuhui District
Railway stations in China opened in 2000
Railway stations in Shanghai